D. Surendran (born 16 April 1980 in Selangor, Malaysia) is a Malaysian footballer, currently unattached.

Career
He has spent his entire career with Selangor FA since breaking into the senior team in 1999. Surendran can play as a defender and midfielder, at the right area.

Among the best moment of his career is scoring the golden goal in extra time to win the 2001 Malaysia FA Cup final for Selangor against Sarawak FA. He was also part of Selangor team that win the treble championship in 2005 and 2009.

He leaves Selangor when his contract was not renewed beyond 2011.

National team
Surendran represented Malaysia in international tournaments. He played at the 2004 Tiger Cup, as well as some 2006 FIFA World Cup qualification matches.

References

External links
 Profile at Selangor FA official website
 

1980 births
Living people
Malaysian footballers
Malaysia international footballers
Malaysia Super League players
Selangor FA players
People from Selangor
Malaysian people of Tamil descent
Malaysian sportspeople of Indian descent
Association football midfielders
Association football defenders